The Fiat 238 was a van produced by the Italian automotive production firm Fiat from 1967 through 1983. The van was introduced in 1967 as the logical successor for the Fiat 1100T. The 238 was based on the chassis of the Autobianchi Primula and had a downtuned version of the Fiat 124's engine. The 238 was produced in many different body styles for utility and personnel transport. In 1974 Fiat introduced a new van, the 242 with a larger petrol engine and also a diesel engine variant. Despite that the sales of Fiat 238 did not weaken and Fiat decided to keep it in its lineup, and made the new bigger 1.4-liter engine also available to the 238 model. The 238 was produced until 1983 and was replaced with Ducato.

The 238 was also briefly built by Germany's Neckar-Fiat. It was also popular for mobile home conversions since the front-wheel-drive packaging allowed for a low, flat floor, enabling a very spacious living area for such a compact and light vehicle. Ruggeri, Weinsberg, Westfalia, and many others provided conversions.

Engines
1197 cc petrol 
1438 cc petrol  ( only ambulances)

External links

German fan-site of the Fiat 238
A restored Israeli Fiat 238 Caravan

238
Vans